Haley Black (born 8 October 1996) is a Canadian swimmer. She competed in the women's 50 metre butterfly event at the 2018 FINA World Swimming Championships (25 m), in Hangzhou, China.

References

External links
 

1996 births
Living people
Canadian female swimmers
Female butterfly swimmers
Place of birth missing (living people)
Pan American Games silver medalists for Canada
Pan American Games medalists in swimming
Swimmers at the 2019 Pan American Games
Medalists at the 2019 Pan American Games
20th-century Canadian women
21st-century Canadian women